83rd meridian may refer to:

83rd meridian east, a line of longitude east of the Greenwich Meridian
83rd meridian west, a line of longitude west of the Greenwich Meridian